The Skirmish at Threlkeld's Ferry was an American Civil War engagement between Union Army and Confederate States Army cavalry detachments in northwest Arkansas on February 5, 1863 during a Union Army scout from Fayetteville, Arkansas to the Arkansas River. The skirmish resulted in a Union victory.

References

Battles of the American Civil War in Arkansas
Conflicts in 1863
1863 in Arkansas
Union victories of the American Civil War
February 1863 events
Washington County, Arkansas